Elimia acuta is a species of freshwater snails with an operculum, aquatic gastropod mollusks in the family Pleuroceridae. This species is endemic to the United States.

References 

Molluscs of the United States
acuta
Gastropods described in 1831
Taxonomy articles created by Polbot
Taxa named by Isaac Lea